David Wonson is an Australian former professional rugby league footballer who played in the 1990s. He played for Western Suburbs and the Illawarra Steelers in the NSWRL competition.

Playing career
Wonson made his first grade debut for Illawarra in round 19 of the 1991 NSWRL season against Cronulla-Sutherland at WIN Stadium. Wonson played off the interchange bench during a 44-6 victory. Wonson played a total of five games for Illawarra over a three year period. In 1994, Wonson joined Western Suburbs and made two appearances for the club but was released at the end of the season.

References

Western Suburbs Magpies players
Illawarra Steelers players
Australian rugby league players
Rugby league second-rows
Living people
Year of birth missing (living people)